William Robert Colton  (25 December 1867 – 13 November 1921) was a British sculptor. After completing his studies in London and Paris, Colton established himself with solid, career-long business relationships, secured admission to exhibitions at the Royal Academy and the Salon in Paris. His works included commissions for busts, statues and war memorials. His clientele included royalty in England and India.

During his career, Colton was a professor at the Royal Academy, president of the Royal British Society of Sculptors and full member at the Royal Academy.

Early life
Colton was born in Paris on 25 December 1867. His father was an architect. In 1870 Colton left Paris for London. He studied at the Lambeth School of Art in England under William Silver Frith before enrolling as a student in the Royal Academy in 1889. At the Royal Academy, he was taught by Henry Hugh Armstead and Sir Joseph Edgar Boehm. He also studied in Paris.

Career

Commissions
Within two years of his 20th birthday, Colton was exhibiting at both the Paris Salon and the Royal Academy. Auguste Rodin and Alfred Gilbert provided inspiration for Colton's work.

He received a commission from the Krishna Raja Wadiyar IV, Maharajah of Mysore and continued to receive commissions from India throughout his career. Besides his engagements for work in England, Colton also received commissions for work in Australia and South Africa. On 21 January 1903 Colton was elected as an Associate to the Royal Academy. He became a full member sixteen years later in 1919 on 25 April. In 1921 he became the president of the Royal British Society of Sculptors (RBS).

Education
From 1907 to 1911 he was Professor of Sculpture at the Royal Academy.

Works

Sculptures
This is a partial list of Colton's sculptures, busts and plaques.

War Memorials

Worcester Boer War Memorial
The Worcester Boer War Memorial, located in the grounds of Worcester Cathedral, is a bronze depiction of a hatless figure who is protected by an angel.  The memorial consists of a three-stepped base surmounted by a plinth, pedestal and figure of a soldier of the Worcester Regiment kneeling as he prepares to fire his last cartridge. A winged figure said to represent "Immortality" stands above him with a palm branch in one hand, and in the other hand a sheathed sword with laurel wreath on it. The memorial is dedicated to the men of Worcestershire killed in the South African War. It was unveiled on 23 September 1908 by Lt. Gen. the Hon. Sir N. G. Lyttleton. The monument was restored in 2005.

Royal Artillery Boer War Memorial
The Royal Artillery Boer War Memorial is on the corner of St James's Park in The Mall in central London. The memorial was designed by Sir Aston Webb and the bronze sculpture, including Pegasus and the two relief tablets, were executed by Colton. Completed in 1909 the composition was described by Colton as "War being controlled by peace, war being represented by a war horse & peace being a winged female figure." In the same letter Colton writes that the work "has become in a sense a part of the Queen Victoria Memorial Scheme." The pillars list the 1,078 men who died in the South African war of 1899-1902 and relief panels show the unit in action. The memorial was unveiled in 1920 by the Duke of Connaught, using an electronic remote control from a memorial service in St Paul's Cathedral. The memorial was erected by the officers and men of the Royal Artillery in memory of their honoured dead. The pedestal is in Portland stone and the sculpture, reliefs and panels with the names of those remembered, are all in bronze.

W. T. Wyllie Memorial
The W. T. Wyllie memorial in Portsmouth Cathedral is positioned on the East wall of the Quire and east of the Corporation Pew and remembers the second son of William Lionel and Marion Amy Wyllie. William Thomas Wyllie served with the 2nd Durham Light Infantry and was killed in action at Montauban on the Somme on 19 July 1916. He was acting as a Brigade Major at the time and is buried in Mametz Cemetery. He left a widow and three children. The memorial features a sculptured figure in silhouette/high relief which lies along the bottom half. This figure is the dead body of an officer lying on his back, arms by his side. His shirt sleeves are rolled up and he wears braces, trousers and boots. His head rests on a cushion surrounded by a laurel wreath. The inscription is incised in white lettering along the top half of the memorial. The bronze founders were Messrs A. B. Burton.

Captain F C Selous DSO
The memorial tablet dedicated to Captain Frederick Selous DSO is positioned at the head of the northwest staircase in the Central Hall of the Natural History Museum, London. The figure and plaque are in bronze and the tablet is in stone. The memorial consists of a cast bronze portrait of Captain Selous in uniform and carrying a rifle. This is set into a niche in the stone tablet. Below the niche is a bronze relief of lions. The inscriptions are arranged in two side panels in raised block lettering. The sculptor's name is placed at the bottom right. The inscription on the left panel reads Caption Frederick C. Selous D.S.O. Hunter Explorer and Naturalist.. On the right panel Born 1851 Killed in action at Beho-Beho German East Africa 4 1 1917.. Selous was buried in East Africa in what is now Tanzania.

Boyd and Claud Alexander
At St Dunstan's Church, Cranbrook, Kent, there is an alabaster memorial to Boyd and Claud Alexander who both died in Africa. Boyd Alexander served in the Rifle Brigade and was killed at Nyeri, Wadai, on 2 April 1910 and is remembered on the left side panel; Claud Alexander who served in the Scots Guards and died at Maifoni on 13 November 1904 is remembered on the right side panel. A representation of Africa in the form of a female figure holding arrows is positioned in the centre with busts of the two dead men on either side. The left hand panel includes representations of animals and trees and the right hand panel features a landscape scene.

Staffordshire County War Memorial
The memorial, on Victoria Road, Stafford, was designed by Colton but his early death meant that the sculptor L. S. Merrifield had to complete the work. The memorial is dedicated to the soldiers from Staffordshire who died in service to their country during World War I. The memorial stands on a four-stepped base surmounted by two plinths and a column. In Colton's composition we see the figure of an angel with olive branch and a horse. This grouping is modelled after the Royal Artillery Boer War Memorial. There is a Stafford knot on the front face of the pedestal. The memorial was completed in 1923, following Colton's death. The Earl of Dartmouth, whose son was one of the men memorialized by the monument, performed the unveiling.

Personal life
In 1902 Colton married Mignon Kroll de Laporte. Two daughters were born to the couple.

Robert Colton died at age of 53 on 13 November 1921 at St Mary Abbot's Place, Kensington. due to complications from a surgery approximately four weeks before his death.

References

Further reading

 Mary Chamot, Dennis Farr and Martin Butlin. (1964). The Modern British Paintings, Drawings and Sculpture, London.
 Spielmann, Marion Harry. (1901). British Sculpture and Sculptors of Today. London: Cassell. Internet Archive. Web. 22 December 2011.
 W(illiam) Robert Colton, RA. Mapping the Practice and Profession of Sculpture in Britain and Ireland 1851-1951. University of Glasgow History of Art and HATII, online database 2011. Web. 23 June 2011.

1867 births
1921 deaths
English sculptors
English male sculptors
British architectural sculptors
Artists from Paris
Royal Academicians
20th-century British sculptors
19th-century British sculptors
20th-century English male artists
19th-century English male artists